Joseph Corbin may refer to:
 Joseph Carter Corbin (1833–1911), American educator
 Joseph Louis Corbin (1797–1859), French general